Jessica Cantlon is the Ronald J. and Mary Ann Zdrojkowski Professor of Developmental Neuroscience at the Carnegie Mellon University. In 2017 she was selected as Time Person of the Year as one of the Silence Breakers.

Early life and education 
Cantlon studied anthropology at Indiana University Bloomington. She moved to Duke University for her graduate studies, where she worked with Elizabeth Brannon on the neural bases of mathematical knowledge. Early in her graduate studies, Cantlon trained herself in functional MRI, recognising that neuroimaging could be used to further our understanding of learning. Her research involved investigations into the origin of the human and primate capacity for mathematics. Cantlon showed that monkeys can perform mental arithmetic. Working with Brannon, Cantlon constructed a mathematical task that asked monkeys to deduce whether a series of numbers were larger or smaller than the ones that proceeded them. This study showed that the mechanism that monkeys use to make comparisons are the same as the ones humans use. To prove the numerical skills of monkeys, Cantlon constructed an experiment where macaques interacted with a touchscreen computer that displayed basic mathematical challenges. Cantlon presented the same challenges to college students, who achieved 94% correct answers, whilst the monkeys were successful 76% of the time. The monkeys and college students had the same reaction time. She completed her doctorate in 2007.

Research and career 
Cantlon joined the University of Rochester as an assistant professor in 2009. Here she studied the innate ability of humans to recognise and understand numbers. Whilst the capacity for complicated symbolic mathematics appears to be unique to humans, it is not clear where this numerical prowess emerges from. She combines psychological investigations with Magnetic Resonance Imaging (MRI) and Positron Emission Tomography (PET) to understand mathematical intuition. She continued to study the mathematical abilities of monkeys, showing that even young baboons can differentiate between large and small numbers.

In 2018 Cantlon was made the Zdrojkowski Chair in Developmental Neuroscience at Carnegie Mellon University. Using MRI, Cantlon studied activity in the intraparietal sulcus of young people during numerical tasks. She demonstrated that boys and girls have identical capabilities.

Academic service 
Whilst working at the University of Rochester Cantlon was one of the whistleblowers, along with Richard Aslin and Celeste Kidd, who reported sexual harassment of students by another professor in 2016. Cantlon objected to the university’s sexual harassment procedures when administrators closed the investigation of the professor without interviewing many of the students who were sexually harassed, and then administrators retaliated against Cantlon and Aslin. In 2017 Cantlon and Celeste Kidd and seven other faculty and students sued the University of Rochester, claiming the university broke sexual harassment laws and covered it up. In 2020, a federal judge ruled in favour of Cantlon and her co-plaintiffs, stating that there was sufficient evidence to move the case forward in court. The court upheld 16 of the 17 plaintiffs’ claims. After that federal court decision, the university initiated a settlement with Cantlon, Kidd, and the other plaintiffs for $9.4 million and issued a statement thanking the plaintiffs for bringing their concerns forward. Cantlon left her position at the University of Rochester in 2018 and took up a position at Carnegie Mellon.

Cantlon was publicly acknowledged for her contributions to combatting sexual harassment in science and continues to speak out about the impact of sexual harassment on women’s careers, and the retaliation she experienced as a whistleblower.

Awards and honours 
 2016 Science News 10 Scientists to Watch
 2017 Time Person of the Year

Selected publications

Personal life 
Cantlon is married to Brad Mahon, a cognitive neuroscientist at Carnegie Mellon University.

References 

Living people
Year of birth missing (living people)
American women psychologists
21st-century American psychologists
Indiana University Bloomington alumni
Carnegie Mellon University faculty
Duke University alumni
American whistleblowers